Andrena erigeniae, the spring beauty miner bee or spring beauty andrena is a species of miner bee native to North America.

References

erigeniae
Articles created by Qbugbot
Insects described in 1891